Diever is a village in the Dutch province of Drenthe. It is a part of the municipality of Westerveld, and lies about 18 km northwest of Hoogeveen.

Diever is located next to the Drents-Friese Wold, one of the national parks in the Netherlands, and a attraction for tourists. In the centre of Diever there is the brink, the village square with old buildings surrounding it. The Dutch Reformed Saint Pancratius-church is a 15th-century building, and considered one of the most beautiful churches of Drenthe.

Diever was a separate municipality until 1998, when the new municipality of Westerveld was created.

Shakespeare
In July and August the local people of Diever perform in dramas written by William Shakespeare. Diever is also known as "Shakespeare-town". The plays are being performed in an open-air theatre. The local amateur theater group was formed in 1946 by a local medical doctor, Mr. Derp Broekema. Thus, in 2006 the 60th anniversary of this annual event was celebrated with the performance of Henry IV.

Gallery

References

Municipalities of the Netherlands disestablished in 1998
Populated places in Drenthe
Former municipalities of Drenthe
Westerveld